The Lewis Curry House is a historic two-story house in Vernal, Utah. It was built in 1910 for Lewis Curry, the manager of the Bank of Vernal. Curry was Presbyterian, and he later served as a member of the Utah House of Representatives. Curry died in 1922, and his brother Matt Curry married his widow, Sallie, and served in the Utah House of Representatives until 1939. The house was inherited by a son, David H. Curry. It has been listed on the National Register of Historic Places since July 26, 1982.

References

		
National Register of Historic Places in Uintah County, Utah
Houses completed in 1910
1910 establishments in Utah